Baseball Talk was a set of 164 "talking" baseball cards that were released by Topps and the LJN Corporation during the spring of 1989. Each card featured a plastic disk affixed to the back of an oversized baseball card. When placed in the SportsTalk player the cards would play two to three minutes of recorded audio. The player retailed for $24.99 and was labeled for ages six and up. It required four AA alkaline batteries to operate. 

The cards featured most of the better known players in baseball in 1988 and were sold in toy stores throughout the United States and Canada during 1989 Major League Baseball season. LJN and Topps planned to debut talking NFL and NBA cards (it stated in print advertising "Coming Soon - NFL Football and NBA Basketball Talking Cards), but those plans, along with follow-up MLB editions, were canceled as the card players often broke or played with poor audio quality. Stores were flooded with returned boxes of Baseball Talk and by the fall of 1989 many of the cards and players could be found in discount bins at places like Toys R Us and Target. At one point, packs of cards that had been priced at $4 a piece were selling for as low as 50 cents by stores that were eager to move a failed product.

Cards 
The SportsTalk player was sold with four cards (a checklist card that served as an introduction to the series, a Hank Aaron card, and the cards of 1988 stars Don Mattingly and Orel Hershiser). Additional cards were sold with four to a pack and were labeled in a manner that let the buyer know what cards were inside. Mel Allen narrated eight cards that featured highlights from historic games as well as 33 cards of former stars such as Babe Ruth and Duke Snider. Hall of Fame legends like Ted Williams, Sandy Koufax, Warren Spahn, Willie Mays, Joe DiMaggio and Bob Feller were omitted from the set as they did not agree to take part.

Don Drysdale interviewed the players of the National League for their cards and Joe Torre did the same for the American League players. Many of the cards featured amusing or humorous anecdotes, such as Mike Flanagan recounting how his Japanese baseball glove manufacturer (Mizuno) spelled his name "Mike Franagan" and that the company's executives told him, "Mr. Franagan, we're very grad you use our grub."

Rare collectibles 
Because the cards and players were on the market for a short period of time and that many of the players did not work well, a complete set and a working player sells for a Beckett book value of $250–300 (Beckett 2008 Almanac).

Checklist 
The following is the numerical checklist for the only set of cards ever released for Baseball Talk.

Eight classic games
 1. 1975 World Series, Game 6 
 2. 1986 World Series, Game 6 
 3. 1986 ALCS, Game 5  
 4. 1956 World Series, Game 5  
 5. 1986 NLCS, Game 6 
 6. 1969 World Series, Game 5 
 7. 1984 World Series, Game 5 
 8. 1988 World Series, Game 1

33 famous former players

 9. Reggie Jackson
 10. Brooks Robinson
 11. Billy Williams
 12. Bobby Thomson
 13. Harmon Killebrew
 14. Johnny Bench
 15. Tom Seaver
 16. Willie Stargell
 17. Ernie Banks
 18. Gaylord Perry
 19. Bill Mazeroski
 20. Babe Ruth
 21. Lou Gehrig
 22. Ty Cobb
 23. Bob Gibson
 24. Al Kaline
 25. Rod Carew
 26. Lou Brock
 27. Stan Musial
 28. Joe Morgan
 29. Willie McCovey
 30. Duke Snider
 31. Whitey Ford
 32. Eddie Mathews
 33. Carl Yastrzemski
 34. Pete Rose
 35. Hank Aaron (b) Final season
 36. Ralph Kiner
 37. Steve Carlton
 38. Roberto Clemente
 39. Don Drysdale
 40. Robin Roberts
 41. Hank Aaron (a) Rookie season

122 Present Day Players and Managers in 1988

By Team 
Each team was represented by at least three players except for the 1988 Baltimore Orioles, who had two (Cal Ripken Jr. and Eddie Murray.) It is possible that the late season trade of Fred Lynn from Baltimore to Detroit did not allow time to find a third Oriole. The New York Mets had the most players with eight.

New York Mets 8 (Hernandez, Carter, Gooden, Darling, Jefferies, Myers, McDowell, and Strawberry)
New York Yankees 7 (Winfield, J. Clark, Guidry, John, Mattingly, Henderson, and Righetti)
Boston Red Sox 7 (Boggs, Clemens, Rice, Evans, L. Smith, Greenwell, and Hurst)
St. Louis Cardinals 7 (O. Smith, Guerrero, McGee, Coleman, Worrell, Magrane, and Brunansky)
Los Angeles Dodgers 7 (Hershiser, Gibson, Marshall, Tudor, Sax, Lasorda, and Valenzuela)
Oakland Athletics 7 (LaRussa, McGwire, Canseco, Welch, Eckersley, Parker, and Lansford)
Minnesota Twins 6 (Hrbek, Gaetti, Viola, Rearden, Blyleven, and Puckett)
Cincinnati Reds 6 (E. Davis, Daniels, Larkin, Sabo, D. Jackson, and Franco)
Detroit Tigers 6 (Anderson, Trammel, Whitaker, Morris, Tanana, and Lynn)
Toronto Blue Jays 5 (G. Bell, Fernandez, Key, Henke, and Flanagan)
San Francisco Giants 5 (W. Clark, Mitchell, Reuschel, Craig, and Maldonado)
Montreal Expos 4 (Raines, Wallach, Galarraga, and Brooks)
Chicago Cubs 4 (Sandberg, Dawson, Sutcliffe, and Gossage)
Pittsburgh Pirates 4 (Bonds, Bonilla, Van Slyke, and LaValliere)
Houston Astros 4 (Ryan, Scott, Bass, and G. Davis)
Cleveland Indians 4 (Snyder, Carter, Butler, and D. Jones)
Kansas City Royals 4 (Saberhagen, Brett, White, and Seitzer)
California Angels 4 (M. Witt, Boone, C. Davis, and Joyner)
Texas Rangers 3 (McDowell, Incaviglia, and Hough)
San Diego Padres 3 (Gwynn, Santiago, and Kruk)
Philadelphia Phillies 3 (Schmidt, Bedrosian, and Samuel)
Atlanta Braves 3 (Murphy, Perry, and Sutter)
Milwaukee Brewers 3 (Molitor, Plesac, and Yount)
Seattle Mariners 3 (A. Davis, H. Reynolds, and Langston)
Chicago White Sox 3 (Guillen, Fisk, and Baines)
Baltimore Orioles 2 (Ripken and Murray)

By Card Number 

 42. Dave Winfield, New York Yankees
 43. Alan Trammell, Detroit Tigers
 44. Darryl Strawberry, New York Mets
 45. Ozzie Smith, St. Louis Cardinals
 46. Kirby Puckett, Minnesota Twins
 47. Will Clark, San Francisco Giants
 48. Keith Hernandez, New York Mets
 49. Wally Joyner, California Angels
 50. Mike Scott, Houston Astros
 51. Eric Davis, Cincinnati Reds
 52. George Brett, Kansas City Royals
 53. George Bell, Toronto Blue Jays
 54. Tommy Lasorda, Los Angeles Dodgers
 55. Rickey Henderson, New York Yankees
 56. Robin Yount, Milwaukee Brewers
 57. Wade Boggs, Boston Red Sox
 58. Roger Clemens, Boston Red Sox
 59. Vince Coleman, St. Louis Cardinals
 60. José Canseco, Oakland Athletics
 61. Fernando Valenzuela, Los Angeles Dodgers
 62. Tony Gwynn, San Diego Padres
 63. Doc Gooden, New York Mets
 64. Mark McGwire, Oakland Athletics
 65. Jack Clark, New York Yankees
 66. Dale Murphy, Atlanta Braves
 67. Kirk Gibson, Los Angeles Dodgers
 68. Jack Morris, Detroit Tigers
 69. Ryne Sandberg, Chicago Cubs
 70. Nolan Ryan, Houston Astros
 71. John Tudor, Los Angeles Dodgers
 72. Mike Schmidt, Philadelphia Phillies
 73. Dave Righetti, New York Yankees
 74. Pedro Guerrero, St. Louis Cardinals
 75. Rick Sutcliffe, Chicago Cubs
 76. Gary Carter, New York Mets
 77. Cal Ripken, Baltimore Orioles
 78. Andre Dawson, Chicago Cubs
 79. Andy Van Slyke, Pittsburgh Pirates
 80. Roc Raines, Montreal Expos
 81. Frank Viola, Minnesota Twins
 82. Don Mattingly, New York Yankees
 83. Rick Reuschel, San Francisco Giants
 84. Willie McGee, St. Louis Cardinals
 85. Mark Langston, Seattle Mariners
 86. Ron Darling, New York Mets
 87. Gregg Jefferies, New York Mets
 88. Harold Baines, Chicago White Sox
 89. Eddie Murray, Baltimore Orioles
 90. Barry Larkin, Cincinnati Reds
 91. Gary Gaetti, Minnesota Twins
 92. Bret Saberhagen, Kansas City Royals
 93. Roger McDowell, New York Mets
 94. Joe Magrane, St. Louis Cardinals
 95. Juan Samuel, Philadelphia Phillies
 96. Bert Blyleven, Minnesota Twins
 97. Kal Daniels, Cincinnati Reds
 98. Kevin Bass, Houston Astros
 99. Glenn Davis, Houston Astros
 100. Steve Sax, Los Angeles Dodgers
 101. Rich Gossage, Chicago Cubs
 102. Roger Craig, San Francisco Giants
 103. Carney Lansford, Oakland Athletics
 104. Joe Carter, Cleveland Indians
 105. Bruce Sutter, Atlanta Braves
 106. Barry Bonds, Pittsburgh Pirates
 107. Danny Jackson, Cincinnati Reds
 108. Mike Flanagan, Toronto Blue Jays
 109. Dwight Evans, Boston Red Sox
 110. Ron Guidry, New York Yankees
 111. Bruce Hurst, Boston Red Sox
 112. Jim Rice, Boston Red Sox
 113. Oddibe McDowell, Texas Rangers
 114. Bobby Bonilla, Pittsburgh Pirates
 115. Bob Welch, Oakland Athletics
 116. Dave Parker, Oakland Athletics
 117. Tim Wallach, Montreal Expos
 118. Tom Henke, Toronto Blue Jays
 119. Mike Greenwell, Boston Red Sox
 120. Kevin Seitzer, Kansas City Royals
 121. Randy Myers, New York Mets
 122. Andrés Galarraga, Montreal Expos
 123. Orel Hershiser, Los Angeles Dodgers
 124. Cory Snyder, Cleveland Indians
 125. Mike Witt, California Angels
 126. Mike LaValliere, Pittsburgh Pirates
 127. Pete Incaviglia, Texas Rangers
 128. Dennis Eckersley, Oakland Athletics
 129. Jimmy Key, Toronto Blue Jays
 v130. John Franco, Cincinnati Reds
 131. Dan Plesac, Milwaukee Brewers
 132. Tony LaRussa, Oakland Athletics
 133. Hubie Brooks, Montreal Expos
 134. Chili Davis, California Angels
 135. Bob Boone, California Angels
 136. Jeff Reardon, Minnesota Twins
 137. Candy Maldonado, San Francisco Giants
 138. Mike Marshall, Los Angeles Dodgers
 139. Tommy John, New York Yankees
 140. Chris Sabo, Cincinnati Reds
 141. Alvin Davis, Seattle Mariners
 142. Frank White, Kansas City Royals
 143. Harold Reynolds, Seattle Mariners
 144. Lee Smith, Boston Red Sox
 145. John Kruk, San Diego Padres
 146. Tony Fernández, Toronto Blue Jays
 147. Steve Bedrosian, Philadelphia Phillies
 148. Benito Santiago, San Diego Padres
 149. Ozzie Guillén, Chicago White Sox
 150. Gerald Perry, Atlanta Braves
 151. Carlton Fisk, Chicago White Sox
 152. Tom Brunansky, St. Louis Cardinals
 153. Paul Molitor, Milwaukee Brewers
 154. Todd Worrell, St. Louis Cardinals
 155. Brett Butler, Cleveland Indians
 156. Sparky Anderson, Detroit Tigers
 157. Kent Hrbek, Minnesota Twins
 158. Frank Tanana, Detroit Tigers
 159. Kevin Mitchell, San Francisco Giants
 160. Charlie Hough, Texas Rangers
 161. Doug Jones, Cleveland Indians
 162. Lou Whitaker, Detroit Tigers
 163. Fred Lynn, Detroit Tigers

One Checklist card 
164. Checklist

See also
 Cardboard record
 Flexi disc

Sources and photographs
Photos and description of player and cards

"Topps to debut Baseball Talk" Beckett Baseball Card Monthly, March 1989. No by-line.

"Baseball Talk Strikes Out - Sales Too Low to Continue Says LJN" by Steve Fleener. Beckett Baseball Card Monthly, November 1989.

Street & Smith 1989 Baseball Guide pages 104 and 105.

References
 

Baseball cards
Card, baseball
Trading cards
Toy brands
1988 Major League Baseball season
1989 Major League Baseball season